Disambiguation: For the Yogurt flavour see Extreme Red Rush.
Wresley "Red" Rush II (July 2, 1927 – January 11, 2009) was an American sportscaster.

A native of Long Beach, California, Rush (nicknamed for his shock of red hair) attended the University of Southern California where he developed his interest in broadcasting.  Rush did play-by-play for several Major League Baseball teams, including the Kansas City A's (1965), Chicago White Sox (1967–70), Oakland A's (1971, 1979–80), and St. Louis Cardinals (1984).  With the White Sox, and with the 1971 A's, Rush worked with Hall of Fame voice Bob Elson, providing raw enthusiasm and excitement to the broadcast in contrast to the more laconic Elson. It is said that A's owner Charlie Finley hired and fired Rush three times. From the '60s to the late '80s Rush was the voice of the Loyola University Ramblers men's college basketball team, and made the famous call of their 1963 NCAA National Championship ("WE WIN! WE WIN!").  He also called games for Northwestern University football, DePaul University basketball, and the Minneapolis Lakers and Golden State Warriors of the NBA.

References

1927 births
2009 deaths
United States Navy personnel of World War II
American radio sports announcers
Chicago White Sox announcers
College basketball announcers in the United States
College football announcers
DePaul University people
Golden State Warriors announcers
Kansas City Athletics announcers
Major League Baseball broadcasters
Minneapolis Lakers announcers
National Basketball Association broadcasters
Oakland Athletics announcers
People from Long Beach, California
Radio personalities from Chicago
St. Louis Cardinals announcers
University of Southern California alumni
World Hockey Association broadcasters